Victor Arkadyevich Ershov (born ) is a Russian wheelchair curler.

One of co-founders of Curling Federation of Sverdlovsk Oblast (2013).

Teams

References

External links 

Уральский характер - Фонд социального страхования Свердловская область Екатеринбург
 (video inside)

Living people
1958 births
Sportspeople from Yekaterinburg
Russian male curlers
Russian wheelchair curlers